Ioannis Karpouzlis (born 1 March 1992) is a Greek swimmer. He competed in the men's 50 metre breaststroke event at the 2017 World Aquatics Championships.

References

1992 births
Living people
Greek male swimmers
Place of birth missing (living people)
Swimmers at the 2010 Summer Youth Olympics
Mediterranean Games silver medalists for Greece
Mediterranean Games medalists in swimming
Swimmers at the 2018 Mediterranean Games
Male breaststroke swimmers